The Silver Bridge was a United States bridge that spanned the Ohio River from 1928 until it collapsed in 1967.  

Silver Bridge or Silverbridge may also refer to 

 Silver Memorial Bridge, the replacement for the above bridge, opened in 1969.
 Silverbridge, County Armagh, a village in Northern Ireland
 Silverbridge Harps GFC, a Gaelic football club in County Armagh

Literature
 The Silver Bridge, a book linking the collapse of the Silver Bridge and the paranormal, by Gray Barker
 The Silver Bridge, a collection of poetry by Elizabeth Akers Allen
 "Silverbridge" is a fictional location in the Palliser novels by Anthony Trollope

Music
 "Silver Bridge", a song by Suzanne Vega from her 2014 album Tales from the Realm of the Queen of Pentacles

See also
 
 
 Silver Jubilee Bridge, in Halton, England
 Silver Jubilee Railway Bridge Bharuch, in India
 Silver Street Bridge, in Cambridge, England